The Arab Beach Soccer Championship is the main championship for beach soccer in the Arab world. The first championship was held in 2008 in Marsa Alam, Egypt. The most successful nation is the Libya and Saudi Arabia.

Tournaments

Successful nations

Participating nations

 Red Border: Host nation.
 Blank: Did not enter.
 GS: Group Stage.

See also
 2019 Neom Beach Soccer Cup

References

External links
Third Arab Beach Soccer Championship - goalzz.com
  Results & Schedule (PDF)

 
Union of Arab Football Associations competitions
Beach soccer competitions